Ravipops (The Substance) is a studio album by American rapper C-Rayz Walz. It was released on Definitive Jux in 2003.

Critical reception
David Jeffries of AllMusic gave the album 3 stars out of 5, saying: "There's a new producer for practically every track, but the album flows well enough, keeping things more traditional than expected for a Definitive Jux release, and the freestyling ranges from biting to abstract." Meanwhile, Rollie Pemberton of Pitchfork gave the album a 6.8 out of 10, saying, "regardless of his anti-platinum rhyme campaign, Ravipops still seems to come off like a well-written commercial hustler album without the production values."

Track listing

References

External links 
 

2003 albums
C-Rayz Walz albums
Definitive Jux albums
Albums produced by Plain Pat